Aciphylla is a genus of about 40 species of plants in the family Apiaceae, endemic to New Zealand and Australia. They generally grow as tall spikes surrounded by rosettes of stiff, pointed leaves. Some species are known as Spaniard Grass.

References

External links

Apioideae
Apioideae genera